The 2½ Pillars Of Wisdom is the collective name for three novels by Alexander McCall Smith.
All three novels centre on the exploits of Moritz-Maria von Igelfeld. 
The title refers to the main character and his colleagues; the front matter explains that von Igelfeld  “had heard the three of them described as the Three Pillars of Wisdom, but looking at Professor Dr Detlev Amadeus Unterholzer he came to the conclusion that perhaps The 2½ Pillars of Wisdom might be more appropriate”.

1997 Portuguese Irregular Verbs
2003 The Finer Points of Sausage Dogs
2003 At the Villa of Reduced Circumstances

References 

 
Novel series